Artemisia californica, also known as California sagebrush, is a species of western North American shrub in the sunflower family.

Description
The stems of the plant are slender, flexible, and glabrous (hairless) or canescent (fuzzy). Their leaves are hairy and light green to gray in color; the margins of the leaves curl under.

The inflorescences are leafy, narrow, and sparse. The pistillate flowers range in number from 6 to 10 and the disk flowers range from 15 to 30; they are generally yellowish, but sometimes red.

The fruits produced are resinous achenes up to 1.5 mm long. There is a pappus present that forms a minute crown on the achene body.

The plant contains terpenes which make it quite aromatic. Many people regard the species as having a pleasant smell.

Distribution and habitat 

The shrub is native to western California and northwestern Baja California. It is endemic to the California chaparral and woodlands ecoregion, in coastal sage scrub, coastal strand, chaparral, and dry foothill communities. This species is also found on many islands adjacent to the Baja California peninsula, including the Coronado Islands and Cedros Island. It is even found on Guadalupe Island, in the Pacific Ocean.

The prototypical plant association of A. californica is chaparral, notably in the California Coast Ranges; toyon and sage are also key components of communities which are transitional between chaparral and coastal sage scrub.  It is often claimed to be allelopathic, secreting chemicals into the ground which inhibit other plants from growing near and around the shrub.

Cultivation 

This shrub is cultivated as an ornamental plant in native plant and wildlife gardens, natural landscaping design, and for restoration of disturbed sites and degraded coastal sage scrub. There are several lower height cultivars in the horticulture trade, for drought-tolerant groundcover use.

It thrives in full sun, preferring to grow on west or north-facing slopes. It needs little water and prefers no water in the summer months; it does not seem that soil types affect plant growth much.  This plant relies on wildfire for seed germination and burned plants can crown-sprout and keep growing.

Animals rarely eat Artemisia californica, probably due to the presence of bitter aromatic terpenes, but it does provide good cover for smaller birds and other animals that can fit between its stems. It is an important habitat plant for the endangered California gnatcatcher.

Uses 
A. californica is a sagebrush, not a true sage, making it of little culinary interest.

Medicinal
The Cahuilla natives employed the plant as a treatment to fight coughs and colds. They chewed the leaves, either dried or fresh. It was used by women of the Cahuilla and Tongva to alleviate menstrual cramps and to ease labor. The plant stimulates the uterine mucosa, which quickened childbirth. It was also made into a decoction, and if taken regularly prior to menstruation, it relieved menstrual cramps and menopause. The Ohlone used it as a pain remover by applying the leaves to wounds or teeth. It was also made into a tea bath to cure colds, coughs, and rheumatism. It was used as a poultice for asthma as well.

A. californica is used to make a liniment that is a powerful pain reliever. The monoterpenoids in the plant interact with transient receptor potential cation channels to relieve pain. The plant also contains sesquiterpenes that may be involved in pain relief. The liniment is more powerful than opioid drugs and is much safer. A small amount of the liniment is applied where it is needed. Within 20 minutes, the pain subsides, even pain from broken bones, arthritis, sprains and strains.

See also
List of California native plants

References

External links

Calflora Database: Artemisia californica  (California sagebrush,  Coast sagebrush)
Jepson Manual eFlora (TJM2) treatment of Artemisia californica
USDA Plants Profile for Artemisia californica (coastal sagebrush)
UC Photos gallery: Artemisia californica

californica
Flora of California
Flora of Baja California
Flora of Mexican Pacific Islands
Natural history of the California chaparral and woodlands
Natural history of the California Coast Ranges
Natural history of the Channel Islands of California
Natural history of the San Francisco Bay Area
Natural history of the Santa Monica Mountains
Natural history of the Peninsular Ranges
Natural history of the Transverse Ranges
Plants described in 1831
Plants used in traditional Native American medicine
Garden plants of North America
Drought-tolerant plants
Flora without expected TNC conservation status